Laundreaux Creek is a stream in the U.S. state of South Dakota.

A variant name was Laundry Creek. The creek derives its name from Alex Laundry, an early settler.

See also
List of rivers of South Dakota

References

Rivers of Dewey County, South Dakota
Rivers of South Dakota